Damon Darron Jones (born August 25, 1976) is an American professional basketball coach and former player who was an assistant coach for the Cleveland Cavaliers of the National Basketball Association (NBA).

A combo guard, he played college basketball for three years with the University of Houston Cougars before declaring early for the 1997 NBA Draft, but he went undrafted. After his playing career ended, Jones joined the Cavaliers coaching staff.

High school career
Jones played for the Ball High School Golden Tornadoes basketball team. He went on to the University of Houston after his graduation in 1994.

Professional career
A journeyman throughout his career, Jones never played for the same team for more than one season except for 2005–2008, when he played for the Cleveland Cavaliers. In his career, he played for ten different teams.

Jones was most notable for his ability to make three-point field goals. In fact, three-point attempts made up the majority of his field goal attempts because his role was often to wait on the outside while teammates such as Shaquille O'Neal, Dwyane Wade, or LeBron James forced double teams. Jones was supremely confident of his shot, once proclaiming that he is "the best shooter in the world."

Early career
Jones played for the Idaho Stampede of the Continental Basketball Association (CBA) during the 1998–99 season. He was selected as the CBA Newcomer of the Year and named to the All-CBA First Team.

2004–2005
Prior to the 2004–2005 season, Jones signed a one-year, $2.5 million contract with the Miami Heat. Jones then proceeded to have the best statistical season of his career, setting career highs in games started (66), minutes played (2,576), field goals made (331) and attempted (726), field goal percentage (45.6%), three-point field goals made (225) and attempted (521), three-point field goal percentage (43.2%), free throws made (68) and attempted (86), rebounds (231), steals (44), blocked shots (5) and points scored (955).
His 225 three-point field goals made was third best in the NBA (and at the time, tied with Mitch Richmond for the ninth most ever in an NBA season) and his three-point field goal percentage was fifth best that season.

Jones had a career-high 31 points on February 16, 2005 against the Los Angeles Clippers and scored in double figures on 48 occasions.  He also had his only game with two blocked shots on March 10, 2005 against the Minnesota Timberwolves. Jones grabbed a career-high eight rebounds on November 6, 2004 against the Washington Wizards, a mark he tied on February 22, 2005 against the Chicago Bulls.

In 15 playoff games, Jones averaged 12.1 points and 4.0 assists, and shot 42.9% from three-point range.  He had a career playoff high of 30 points with seven three-point field goals made in Miami's first game of the first round against the New Jersey Nets.  Jones scored in double digits during 10 of Miami's 15 playoff games.

Cleveland Cavaliers: 2005–2008
Jones departed the Heat to sign a four-year contract worth a reported $16.1 million with the Cleveland Cavaliers on September 8, 2005. In 82 games played (seven starts) during the 2005–06 regular season, Jones averaged 6.7 points and 2.1 assists per game. He shot 37.7% from three-point range. On November 13, 2006, he had a season-high 22 points on a season-high 5 three-point field goals. Jones hit five three-point field goals on four other occasions. On March 8, 2006, Jones hit a game-winning three-point field goal as time expired in a 98–97 victory against the Toronto Raptors.

In the 2006 NBA Playoffs, Jones played in 13 games, averaged 1.8 points and hit 27.8% of his three-pointers.  He had a playoff high 8 points in a game four Eastern Conference Semifinal win against the Detroit Pistons.

On May 5, 2006, Jones came off the bench late in Game 6 of the Cavs' Eastern Conference first-round series against the Washington Wizards. In his first minute of the game action, in overtime, he hit the game-winning shot to clinch the series four games to two, and sent the Cavs into the second round of the NBA Playoffs for the first time since 1993.

In 60 games played during the 2006–2007 regular season, Jones averaged 6.6 points and 1.6 assists per game.  He shot 38.5% from three-point range.  On November 13, 2006, he had a season-high 29 points on a season-high 7 three-point field goals.

Jones was selected to participate in the Three-Point Shootout during the 2007 All-Star Weekend in Las Vegas, Nevada. Jones finished in fifth place.

In the 2007 NBA Playoffs, Jones played in 11 games, averaged 2.4 points and hit 31.8% of his three-pointers. He had a playoff high 9 points on three three-point field goals in a game one NBA Final loss to the San Antonio Spurs.

Jones played in 68 regular season games (three starts) for the Cavaliers. He averaged 6.4 points and 1.9 assists and shot 41.7% from three-point range.  Jones had a season-high 27 points on a season-high seven three-point field goals in a February 22, 2008 short-handed Cavs victory over the Washington Wizards.

In five playoff games, Jones scored six total points and dished one assist.

On December 28, 2007, it was revealed that the Cavaliers fined Jones and Ira Newble an undisclosed amount of money for refusing to come off the bench during the final minute of their Christmas Day win over the Miami Heat.

2008–2009
On August 13, 2008, Jones was traded to the Milwaukee Bucks in a three-team, six-player deal involving the Bucks, the Cleveland Cavaliers, and the Oklahoma City Thunder that also sent Milwaukee's Mo Williams to Cleveland, Cleveland's Joe Smith and Milwaukee's Desmond Mason to Oklahoma City, and Oklahoma City's Luke Ridnour and Adrian Griffin to Milwaukee.

2010
On March 29, 2010, Jones signed with the Piratas de Quebradillas of the Puerto Rico Basketball League. However, on April 13 he was released, after averaging only 10.7 points in four games played.

2011
In February 2011, he signed with Aliağa Petkim in Turkey, but didn't pass the physical fitness test and was released.

2012
After a stint with the Reno Bighorns of the NBA Development League (NBA D-League), Jones retired from playing in 2012.

Coaching career
In 2014, Jones became a part of the coaching staff for the Cleveland Cavaliers with the title of "shooting consultant," working with both the Cavaliers and their NBADL affiliate the Canton Charge. During the 2015–16 season, Jones served as an assistant coach with the  Charge.

In April 2016, Cavaliers head coach Tyronn Lue added Jones to his coaching staff for the 2016 NBA Playoffs. The Cavaliers went on to win the championships over the Golden State Warriors in seven games, being the first team to overcome a 3–1 deficit. In September 2016, Jones was promoted to the full-time role of assistant coach for the Cavaliers. In March 2018, Cavaliers shooting guard J.R. Smith threw a bowl of soup at Jones and was suspended for one game by the team.

Records, milestones and rankings
Ranked third in the NBA in three-point field goals made (225) in 2004–2005.
Ranked 5th in the NBA in three-point field goal percentage (43.2%) in 2004–2005.
Led the NBA in "True Shooting Percentage" (62.5%) in 2004–2005.

Personal life
Jones majored in sociology at the University of Houston.
On January 10, 2006, Jones became the first NBA player to sign with a Chinese shoe company when he signed a two-year contract with Li-Ning.
Damon Jones has a child with Former WNBA star and Women's Basketball Hall of Fame Tina Thompson.

NBA career statistics

Regular season

|-
| style="text-align:left;"| 
| style="text-align:left;"| New Jersey
| 11 || 0 || 11.9 || .318 || .345 || .846 || 1.2 || 1.2 || .6 || .0 || 4.5
|-
| style="text-align:left;"| 
| style="text-align:left;"| Boston
| 13 || 0 || 16.4 || .387 || .455 || .750 || 2.4 || 2.2 || .5 || .0 || 5.8
|-
| style="text-align:left;"| 
| style="text-align:left;"| Golden State
| 13 || 1 || 15.1 || .463 || .478 || .778 || 1.2 || 3.0 || .5 || .0 || 5.2
|-
| style="text-align:left;"| 
| style="text-align:left;"| Dallas
| 42 || 0 || 9.9 || .357 || .330 || .641 || .9 || 1.4 || .3 || .0 || 3.9
|-
| style="text-align:left;"| 
| style="text-align:left;"| Vancouver
| 71 || 10 || 19.9 || .409 || .364 || .712 || 1.7 || 3.2 || .5 || .0 || 6.5
|-
| style="text-align:left;"| 
| style="text-align:left;"| Detroit
| 67 || 0 || 16.2 || .401 || .371 || .729 || 1.5 || 2.1 || .3 || .0 || 5.1
|-
| style="text-align:left;"| 
| style="text-align:left;"| Sacramento
| 49 || 1 || 14.5 || .381 || .364 || .741 || 1.4 || 1.6 || .4 || .1 || 4.6
|-
| style="text-align:left;"| 
| style="text-align:left;"| Milwaukee
| 82 || 26 || 24.6 || .401 || .359 || .764 || 2.1 || 5.8 || .4 || .0 || 7.0
|-
| style="text-align:left;"| 
| style="text-align:left;"| Miami
| 82 || 66 || 31.4 || .456 || .432 || .791 || 2.8 || 4.3 || .5 || .1 || 11.6
|-
| style="text-align:left;"| 
| style="text-align:left;"| Cleveland
| 82 || 7 || 25.5 || .387 || .377 || .640 || 1.6 || 2.1 || .5 || .0 || 6.7
|-
| style="text-align:left;"| 
| style="text-align:left;"| Cleveland
| 60 || 0 || 19.6 || .386 || .385 || .682 || 1.1 || 1.6 || .3 || .0 || 6.6
|-
| style="text-align:left;"| 
| style="text-align:left;"| Cleveland
| 67 || 3 || 19.9 || .416 || .417 || .714 || 1.1 || 1.9 || .3 || .0 || 6.5
|-
| style="text-align:left;"| 
| style="text-align:left;"| Milwaukee
| 18 || 0 || 6.0 || .324 || .393 || .000 || .3 || .4 || .2 || .0 || 1.8
|- class="sortbottom"
| style="text-align:center;" colspan="2"| Career
| 657 || 114 || 20.5 || .407 || .390 || .727 || 1.6 || 2.7 || .4 || .0 || 6.6

Playoffs

|-
| style="text-align:left;"| 2002
| style="text-align:left;"| Detroit
| 10 || 0 || 18.1 || .381 || .296 || .750 || 2.1 || 2.5 || .5 || .0 || 4.3
|-
| style="text-align:left;"| 2004
| style="text-align:left;"| Milwaukee
| 5 || 5 || 28.8 || .529 || .476 || .667 || 4.0 || 7.4 || 1.0 || .0 || 10.0
|-
| style="text-align:left;"| 2005
| style="text-align:left;"| Miami
| 15 || 15 || 33.2 || .481 || .429 || .600 || 2.7 || 4.0 || .5 || .0 || 12.1
|-
| style="text-align:left;"| 2006
| style="text-align:left;"| Cleveland
| 13 || 0 || 13.9 || .308 || .278 || .750 || 1.2 || .9 || .2 || .0 || 1.8
|-
| style="text-align:left;"| 2007
| style="text-align:left;"| Cleveland
| 11 || 0 || 12.6 || .308 || .318 || 1.000 || .8 || 1.0 || .0 || .0 || 2.4
|-
| style="text-align:left;"| 2008
| style="text-align:left;"| Cleveland
| 5 || 0 || 5.2 || .200 || .286 || .000 || .0 || .2 || .0 || .0 || 1.2
|- class="sortbottom"
| style="text-align:center;" colspan="2"| Career
| 59 || 20 || 19.8 || .427 || .382 || .660 || 1.8 || 2.5 || .3 || .0 || 5.6

Notes

External links

NBA.com Profile
NBA D-League Profile
Official Home Page
Career at Eurobasket.com

1976 births
Living people
African-American basketball players
American expatriate basketball people in Canada
American expatriate basketball people in Italy
American expatriate basketball people in Venezuela
American men's basketball players
Basketball coaches from Texas
Basketball players from Texas
Boston Celtics players
Cleveland Cavaliers players
Dallas Mavericks players
Detroit Pistons players
Golden State Warriors players
Houston Cougars men's basketball players
Miami Heat players
Milwaukee Bucks players
New Jersey Nets players
Piratas de Quebradillas players
Point guards
Reno Bighorns players
Sacramento Kings players
Shooting guards
Sportspeople from Galveston, Texas
Undrafted National Basketball Association players
Vancouver Grizzlies players
21st-century African-American sportspeople
20th-century African-American sportspeople